Lenina is a rural locality (a settlement) and the administrative center of Kotelnikovskoye Rural Settlement, Kotelnikovsky District, Volgograd Oblast, Russia. The population was 464 as of 2010. There are 9 streets.

Geography 
Lenina is located on the left bank of the Aksay Kurmoyarsky, 11 km east of Kotelnikovo (the district's administrative centre) by road. Karaichev is the nearest rural locality.

References 

Rural localities in Kotelnikovsky District